Hungry as the Sea is a 1978 Wilbur Smith novel.

It was his first with an American setting and was his first American best seller.

No film of it has been made.

A screenplay to Hungry As The Sea was written by David Grober in 1983, represented by ICM.

References

Novels by Wilbur Smith
Heinemann (publisher) books
1978 British novels